The National Union of Namibian Workers (NUNW) is one of three national trade union centers in Namibia. It was established in 1970 and is affiliated with SWAPO, Namibia's ruling political party.

History
NUNW was originally established as a general workers union in April 1970 through a resolution of the 1969/70 South West Africa People's Organisation (SWAPO) party congress in Tanzania. From that time, NUNW became the trade union wing of SWAPO.

In 1978, the NUNW affiliated to the World Federation of Trade Unions (WTFU). The headquarters in exile of the NUNW were set up in Luanda, Angola in 1979. From 1986, various industrial unions were established inside Namibia under the umbrella of the NUNW and in 1989, a consolidation congress took place that merged the exiled and internal wings of the NUNW into a unified federation. NUNW was thus, as a trade union center, formally established in 1989. In 1991, NUNW had seven affiliated unions with a total membership of over 60,000.

In October 2009 the NUNW affiliated to the International Trade Union Confederation (ITUC), thus effectively withdrawing from the WFTU. In January 2014, NUNW affirmed its allegiance to SWAPO, citing both a shared experience during colonialism and SWAPO's political positions.

Affiliates
The NUNW has nine affiliated member unions with the following estimated membership in 2017.

Notable members
 Tjekero Tweya, MP, NUNW president 1991–1993
 Bernhardt Esau, Secretary General of NUNW in 1991
 Evilastus Kaaronda, former General Secretary
 Hafeni Ludwigh Ndemula
 Pohamba Shifeta
 Ismael Kasuto, president from 1 May 2015
 Risto Kapenda, current president

See also

 Namibia National Labour Organisation (NANLO)
 Trade Union Congress of Namibia (TUCNA)

References

Trade unions in Namibia
International Trade Union Confederation
1971 establishments in South West Africa
Trade unions established in 1971